Tubilla del Agua
is a village and municipality located in the province of Burgos, Castile and León, Spain. According to the 2004 census (INE), the municipality has a population of 209 inhabitants. The climate is relatively cool in the summer and cold in the winter.

Tubilla del Agua is located in the Rudrón Valley. Valley formed by the River Rudrón  that also separates on the left the moor of La Lora and right the moor of Masa

Also passes through the village the River Ornillo, generating many waterfalls.

Villages
 Bañuelos del Rudrón 
 Covanera
 San Felices del Rudrón
 Tablada del Rudrón
Tubilla del Agua

In this county, in the village of Covanera, is Pozo Azul. It is subject to exploration by cave divers of UK. In 2010, a British-led cave divers team broke a diving world record by exploring 8.8 km (5.5 miles) of the cave.

 Wikimapia: Tubilla del Agua

References

Bibliography 
 Cadiñanos Bardeci, Inocencio (1.987):  Arquitectura fortificada en la provincia de Burgos. Artegraf. Madrid.  Tubilla del Agua: pp. 258 – 259.
 Cidad Pérez, Joaquín (1.988): Tubilla del Agua. Apuntes históricos sobre el Municipio. Imprenta Carmelo. Burgos. 
 Delibes de Castro, Germán & Rojo Guerra, Manuel & Represa Bermejo, J. Ignacio (1.993): Dólmenes de La Lora.  II.- Los monumentos megalíticos: características, problemas y accesos. Tubilla del Agua.  Ed. Europa Artes Gráficas. Salamanca.  pp. 83 – 90. 
 Martínez Díez, Gonzalo (1.987): Pueblos y alfoces burgaleses de la repoblación. 3.- Alfoz de Moradillo. 4.- Alfoz de Siero.  Ed. Sever-Cuesta. Valladolid.  pp. 62 – 78

External links
Pozo Azul Website about the Pozo Azul
Underground Everest Video about the British cave diving team which broke the diving world record in 2010 at the Pozo Azul.

See also
Páramos (comarca)
Valle del Rudrón

Municipalities in the Province of Burgos